Chuti Tiu is an American actress of Filipino and Chinese descent. She was Miss Illinois in 1994.

Early life 
Tiu was raised in Milwaukee, Wisconsin to Filipino immigrants. Her father is of Chinese origin and her mother is Filipina-Spanish. Her parents came to the United States as medical residents with "just $50 to their names and built a life from scratch, knowing no one." Tiu attended Divine Savior Holy Angels, an all girls high school.

Education 
Tiu earned a B.A. in Economics and Political Science from Northwestern University.

Career 
In 1994, Tiu was crowned 1994 Miss Illinois.

In 2000, Tiu became a lead actress in Sally Field's directorial debut Beautiful. Tiu has had many supporting roles in independent features such as The Specials with Rob Lowe and Thomas Haden Church. Tiu's television work includes a series regular role in Desire, a recurring role in the suspense thriller 24 starring Kiefer Sutherland, as well as guest/recurring appearances on such shows as The Closer, Dragnet, Charmed, General Hospital and Days of Our Lives. Chuti played Nurse Longino in the CBS series Miami Medical. She was seen as Lata, an attorney defending Woody Harrelson in the film Rampart, also starring Sigourney Weaver, Ben Foster, Anne Heche and Steve Buscemi.

Filmography

Awards 
 1987 Distinguished Young Women Award. 
 2014 10 Wins and 3 Nominations for Pretty Rosebud

Personal life 
Tiu's husband is Oscar Torre.

References

External links
 
 Chutitiu.com
 Chuti Tiu at latinheat.com

Living people
Actresses from Milwaukee
American people of Filipino descent
American people of Chinese descent
Northwestern University alumni
Place of birth missing (living people)
Year of birth missing (living people)
21st-century American women